The 1992–93 Open Russian Championship season was the first season of the Open Russian Championship, the second level of ice hockey in Russia. CSK VVS Samara won the championship by defeating Sibir Novosibirsk in the final.

First round

Central Zone

Western Zone

Volga Zone

Ural Zone

Siberian-Far Eastern Zone

Second round

Central-Western Zone

Volga-Ural Zone

Siberian-Far Eastern Zone

Playoffs

1/8 Finals 
 Dizelist Pensa - Sokol Novochebokarsk 2:0 (2.1 SO, 6:1)
 Mars Tver - Olimpiya Kirovo-Chepetsk 2:1 (3:2, 3:4, 4:1)
 Sibir Novosibirsk - Neman Grodno 2:1 (4:3, 4:6, 4:3)
 Vyatich Ryazan - Mechel Chelyabinsk 2:0 (3:1, 6:4)

Quarterfinals 
 Mars Tver - Kristall Elektrostal 0:2 (1:2, 2:9)
 Sibir Novosibirsk - Rubin Tyumen 2:0 (5:0, 3:0)
 Dizelist Penza - CSK VVS Samara 1:2 (2:3, 5:0 Forfeit, 3:4)
 Vyatich Ryazan - SKA Khabarovsk 0:2 (1:2, 4:5)

Semifinals 
 Sibir Novosibirsk - Kristall Elektrostal 3:2 (3:5, 0:5, 4:2, 3:1, 5:4 OT)
 CSK VVS Samara - SKA Khabarovsk 3:2 (3:1, 6:2, 0:4, 2:4, 8:4)

Final 
 CSK VVS Samara - Sibir Novosibirsk 3:0 (6:4, 6:4, 3:1)

Placing games 
7th place
 Olimpiya Kirovo-Chepetsk - Sokol Novocheboksarsk 2:0 (7:5, 6:5)

5th place
 Vyatich Ryazan - Dizelist Penza 2:0 (7:2, 3:2)

Placing round

Central-Western Zone

Volga-Ural Zone

External links 
 Season on hockeyarchives.info
 Season on hockeyarchives.ru

2
Russian Major League seasons
1992–93 in European second tier ice hockey leagues